Verkhivtsi is a village (selo) in Sambir Raion, Lviv Oblast, in south-west Ukraine. It belongs to Biskovychi rural hromada, one of the hromadas of Ukraine. 

The local Orthodox church was mentioned in 1507.

References 

Villages in Sambir Raion